A business magnate, also known as a tycoon, is a person who has achieved immense wealth through the ownership of multiple lines of enterprise. The term characteristically refers to a powerful entrepreneur or investor who controls, through personal enterprise ownership or a dominant shareholding position, a firm or industry whose goods or services are widely consumed. Such individuals have been known by different terms throughout history, such as industrialists, robber barons, captains of industry, czars, moguls, oligarchs, plutocrats, or taipans.

Etymology
The term magnate derives from the Latin word magnates (plural of magnas), meaning "great man" or "great nobleman".

The term mogul is an English corruption of mughal, Persian or Arabic for "Mongol". It alludes to emperors of the Mughal Empire in Medieval India, who possessed great power and storied riches capable of producing wonders of opulence, such as the Taj Mahal.

The term tycoon derives from the Japanese word , which means "great lord", used as a title for the shōgun. The word entered the English language in 1857 with the return of Commodore Perry to the United States. US President Abraham Lincoln was humorously referred to as the Tycoon by his aides John Nicolay and John Hay. The term spread to the business community, where it has been used ever since.

Usage
Modern business magnates are entrepreneurs that amass on their own or wield substantial family fortunes in the process of building or running their own businesses. Some are widely known in connection with these entrepreneurial activities, others through highly-visible secondary pursuits such as philanthropy, political fundraising and campaign financing, and sports team ownership or sponsorship.

The terms mogul, tycoon, and baron were often applied to late-19th- and early-20th-century North American business magnates in extractive industries such as mining, logging and petroleum, transportation fields such as shipping and railroads, manufacturing such as automaking and steelmaking, in banking, as well as newspaper publishing. Their dominance was known as the Second Industrial Revolution, the Gilded Age, or the Robber Baron Era.

Examples of business magnates in the western world include historical figures such as oilman John D. Rockefeller, automobile pioneer Henry Ford, shipping and railroad veterans Aristotle Onassis, Cornelius Vanderbilt, Leland Stanford, Jay Gould, and James J. Hill, steel innovator Andrew Carnegie, newspaper publisher William Randolph Hearst, retail merchant Sam Walton, and banker J. P. Morgan. Contemporary industrial tycoons include e-commerce entrepreneur Jeff Bezos, investor Warren Buffett, computer programmer Bill Gates, technology innovator Steve Jobs, media proprietor Sumner Redstone, steel investor Lakshmi Mittal, telecommunications investor Carlos Slim, Virgin Group founder Sir Richard Branson, entrepreneur Elon Musk, Formula 1 manager Bernie Ecclestone, media entrepreneur Rupert Murdoch, and poultry technologist Frank Perdue.

Business magnates

See also 
 Bloomberg Billionaires Index
 Bourgeoisie
 Business oligarch
 Businessperson
 Chaebol
 Media proprietor
 Real estate investing
 Software industry
 The World's Billionaires

References

External links

 
 
 

Magnate
Business terms
Management occupations
Social classes